Thomas Burns MLA (born 29 August 1960) is a Social Democratic and Labour Party (SDLP) politician who was a Member of the Legislative Assembly (MLA) for South Antrim from 2003 to 2011.

Burns was first elected to Antrim Borough Councillor in 1997. He is currently the Chairman of his local branch of the SDLP.  He lost his seat in the 2011 Northern Ireland Assembly election, but was easily returned to the Borough Council.

Membership
 Vice Chairman of the Council's planning committee
 Crumlin Development Association
 Chairman of Camlin Credit Union in Crumlin
 Member of Citizens Advice Bureau
 Board of Governors of two local schools, St Josephs Primary School and Crumlin High School.

A keen supporter of the Gaelic Athletic Association, Burns is a former player for Aldergrove GAC.

References

External links
 NI Assembly webpage

Living people
1960 births
Members of Antrim Borough Council
Social Democratic and Labour Party MLAs
Northern Ireland MLAs 2003–2007
Northern Ireland MLAs 2007–2011
Politicians from County Antrim